Carnitine-acylcarnitine translocase (CACT) is responsible for passive transport of carnitine and carnitine-fatty acid complexes and  across the inner mitochondrial membrane as part of the carnitine shuttle system.

Function
Fatty acyl–carnitine can diffuse from the cytosol across the porous outer mitochondrial membrane to the intermembrane space, but must utilize CACT to cross the nonporous inner mitochondrial membrane and reach the mitochondrial matrix. CACT is a cotransporter, returning one molecule of carnitine from the matrix to the intermembrane space as one molecule of fatty acyl–carnitine moves into the matrix.

Clinical significance
A disorder is associated with carnitine-acylcarnitine translocase deficiency. This disorder disrupts the carnitine shuttle system from moving fatty acids across the mitochondrial membrane, leading to a decrease in fatty acid catabolism. The result is an accumulation of fatty acid within muscles and liver, decreased tolerance to long term exercise, inability to fast for more than a few hours, muscle weakness and wasting, and a strong acidic smell on the breath (due to protein catabolism).

Model organisms
Model organisms have been used in the study of SLC25A20 function. A conditional knockout mouse line called Slc25a20tm1a(EUCOMM)Wtsi was generated at the Wellcome Trust Sanger Institute. Male and female animals underwent a standardized phenotypic screen to determine the effects of deletion. Additional screens performed:  - In-depth immunological phenotyping

References

Solute carrier family